Alfredo Poviña (1904–1986) was an Argentine sociologist and one of the leading practitioners of academic sociology in Latin America.

Works
History of Latin American sociology (1941)
Sociology Course (1945)
Ontological Issues Sociology (1949).
New history of American sociology (1959)
Treaty of Sociology
Theory of Folklore

Argentine sociologists
People from San Miguel de Tucumán
1904 births
1986 deaths